The BMW K1200GT is a sport-touring motorcycle made by BMW.
and the K1200R. The new model was lighter and more powerful than the 2003 first-generation K1200GT.

The K1200GT's standard equipment includes an adjustable seat and handlebars, integral ABS, dry sump lubrication, panniers, and electronically adjustable screen. Available options include: electronic suspension adjustment (ESA), xenon light, onboard computer including oil level warning, automatic stability control (ASC), heated seat, heated hand grips, tire pressure monitoring (TPM), cruise control and anti-theft alarm.

K1300GT
The new bike also had improved optional ESA-II electronic suspension adjustment, a conventional single indicator switch and concealed crash bars.

References

External links

K1200GT
Shaft drive motorcycles
Sport touring motorcycles
Motorcycles introduced in 2006